Within quantum technology, a quantum sensor utilizes properties of quantum mechanics, such as quantum entanglement, quantum interference, and quantum state squeezing, which have optimized precision and beat current limits in sensor technology.
The field of quantum sensing deals with the design and engineering of quantum sources (e.g., entangled) and quantum measurements that are able to beat the performance of any classical strategy in a number of technological applications. This can be done with photonic systems or solid state systems.

Characteristics 
In photonics and quantum optics, photonic quantum sensing leverages entanglement, single photons and squeezed states to perform extremely precise measurements. Optical sensing makes use of continuously variable quantum systems such as different degrees of freedom of the electromagnetic field, vibrational modes of solids, and Bose–Einstein condensates. These quantum systems can be probed to characterize an unknown transformation between two quantum states. Several methods are in place to improve photonic sensors' quantum illumination of targets, which have been used to improve detection of weak signals by the use of quantum correlation.

Quantum sensors are often built on continuously variable systems, i.e., quantum systems characterized by continuous degrees of freedom such as position and momentum quadratures. The basic working mechanism typically relies on optical states of light, often involving quantum mechanical properties such as squeezing or two-mode entanglement. These states are sensitive to physical transformations that are detected by interferometric measurements.

Quantum sensing can also be utilized in non-photonic areas such as spin qubits, trapped ions, flux qubits, and nanoparticles. These systems can be compared by physical characteristics to which they respond, for example, trapped ions respond to electrical fields while spin systems will respond to magnetic fields. Trapped Ions are useful in their quantized motional levels which are strongly coupled to the electric field. They have been proposed to study electric field noise above surfaces, and more recently, rotation sensors.

In solid-state physics, a quantum sensor is a quantum device that responds to a stimulus. Usually this refers to a sensor that, which has quantized energy levels, uses quantum coherence to measure a physical quantity, or uses entanglement to improve measurements beyond what can be done with classical sensors. There are 4 criteria for solid-state quantum sensors:
  The system has to have discrete, resolvable energy levels.
  You can initialize the sensor and you can perform readout (turn on
    and get answer).
  You can coherently manipulate the sensor.
  The sensor interacts with a physical quantity and has some response to that
  quantity.

Research and applications 
Quantum Sensors have applications in a wide variety of fields including microscopy, positioning systems, communication technology, electric and magnetic field sensors, as well as geophysical areas of research such as mineral prospecting and seismology. Many measurement devices utilize quantum properties in order to probe measurements such as atomic clocks, superconducting quantum interference devices, and nuclear magnetic resonance spectroscopy. With new technological advancements, individual quantum systems can be used as measurement devices, utilizing entanglement, superposition, interference and squeezing to enhance sensitivity and surpass performance of classical strategies.

A good example of an early quantum sensor is an avalanche photodiode (APD). APDs have been used to detect entangled photons. With additional cooling and sensor improvements can be used where photomultiplier tubes (PMT) in fields such as medical imaging. APDs, in the form of 2-D and even 3-D stacked arrays, can be used as a direct replacement for conventional sensors based on silicon diodes.

The Defense Advanced Research Projects Agency (DARPA) launched a research program in optical quantum sensors that seeks to exploit ideas from quantum metrology and quantum imaging, such as  quantum lithography and the NOON state, in order to achieve these goals with optical sensor systems such as lidar. The United States judges quantum sensing to be the most mature of quantum technologies for military use, theoretically replacing GPS in areas without coverage or possibly acting with ISR capabilities or detecting submarine or subterranean structures or vehicles, as well as nuclear material.

Photonic quantum sensors, microscopy and gravitational wave detectors
For photonic systems, current areas of research consider feedback and adaptive protocols. This is an active area of research in discrimination and estimation of bosonic loss.

Injecting squeezed light into interferometers allows for higher sensitivity to weak signals that would be unable to be classically detected. A practical application of quantum sensing is realized in gravitational wave sensing. Gravitational wave detectors, such as LIGO, utilize squeezed light to measure signals below the standard quantum limit. Squeezed light has also been used to detect signals below the standard quantum limit in plasmonic sensors and atomic force microscopy.

Uses of projection noise removal
Quantum sensing also has the capability to overcome resolution limits, where current issues of vanishing distinguishability between two close frequencies can be overcome by making the projection noise vanish. The diminishing projection noise has direct applications in communication protocols and nano-Nuclear Magnetic Resonance.

Other uses of entanglement
Entanglement can be used to improve upon existing atomic clocks or create more sensitive magnetometers.

Quantum radars
Quantum radar is also an active area of research. Current classical radars can interrogate many target bins while quantum radars are limited to a single polarization or range. A proof-of-concept quantum radar or quantum illuminator using quantum entangled microwaves was able to detect low reflectivity objects at room-temperature – such may be useful for improved radar systems, security scanners and medical imaging systems.

Neuroimaging
In neuroimaging, the first quantum brain scanner uses magnetic imaging and could become a novel whole-brain scanning approach.

Gravity cartography of subterraneans

References

Quantum information science
Sensors